Jay Mark Smith (born 29 December 1981) is an English retired semi-professional footballer who played as a defender in the Football League for Brentford. After his release in 2004, he dropped into non-league football and played for Farnborough Town, Grays Athletic and Havant & Waterlooville before retiring in 2009.

Personal life 
As of 2008, Smith was working in planning.

Career statistics

References

External links 

1981 births
Living people
Footballers from Greater London
English footballers
Association football defenders
Brentford F.C. players
Farnborough F.C. players
Grays Athletic F.C. players
Havant & Waterlooville F.C. players
English Football League players
National League (English football) players